Ettringen may refer to:

Ettringen, Bavaria
Ettringen, Mayen-Koblenz

See also
 Ettlingen, a city in Baden-Württemberg, Germany
 Ettingen, a village in Basel-Land, Switzerland